The 2010 Michigan Senate elections were held on November 2 of that year, with partisan primaries to determine each party's nominees on August 3. The election was the last contested under constituency boundaries drawn as a result of the 2000 U.S. Census, and members served in the 96th and 97th Legislatures.

Term-limited Senators
State Senators are only allowed to serve two four-year terms, a maximum of eight years. The following Senators were not eligible to run for a new term in 2010:
 Sen. Jim Barcia (D-31st District)

Candidates and results

District 1-9

Districts 10-19

Districts 20-29

Districts 30-38

27th District by-election
State Senator John Gleason resigned his seat to accept election as the Genesee County Clerk. This triggered a by-election, which was held May 7, 2013. Jim Ananich won the special election with 75.27% of the vote.

See also
Michigan House of Representatives election, 2010

References

 Gongwer News Service: 2010 General Election—Michigan Senate

2010 Michigan elections
Michigan Senate elections
Michigan Senate
November 2010 events in the United States